Terry Wilkins (born 4 July 1953) is a former Australian rules footballer who played with Footscray and Melbourne in the Victorian Football League (VFL).

Notes

External links 		

		
		
		
		
1953 births
Australian rules footballers from Victoria (Australia)		
Western Bulldogs players		
Melbourne Football Club players
West Footscray Football Club players
Living people